Shelley Rees is a Welsh television actress best known for playing the character of Stacey Jones in the Welsh television soap Pobol y Cwm. She also plays the part of Jo Pugh in the S4C drama series 2 Dy a Ni, for which she was nominated for a Welsh BAFTA award. She is now a Councillor for Plaid Cymru in Pentre.

References

External links

CV at agents' website

Living people
Welsh television actresses
People educated at Ysgol Gyfun Llanhari
People from Llwynypia
1974 births